François Guillaume (born 19 October 1932 in Ville-en-Vermois) is a French politician. He was a member of the Rally for the Republic and after then a member of the Union for a Popular Movement. Between 1979 and 1986, he was the president of the Fédération Nationale des Syndicats d'Exploitants d'Agricoles.

He was Minister of Agriculture between 1986 and 1988. Between 1989 and 1994, he was a Member of the European Parliament.  Between 1993 and 2002, He has been a member of Parliament.

References

1932 births
Living people
Union for a Popular Movement politicians
French Ministers of Agriculture
Debout la France politicians
Deputies of the 12th National Assembly of the French Fifth Republic